Kumeta is a Japanese surname. Notable people with the surname include:

, Japanese manga artist
Riki Kumeta (born 1983), Japanese karateka

See also
15246 Kumeta, a main-belt asteroid

Japanese-language surnames